Photinus pyralis, known by the common names common eastern firefly and big dipper firefly, is the most common species of firefly in North America. P. pyralis is a flying and light-producing beetle with a light organ on the ventral side of its abdomen. 
This organism is sometimes incorrectly classified as Photuris pyralis, which likely results from mistaking the similar-sounding genus Photuris.

The Photuris female may also lure a Photinus pyralis to be eaten to obtain spider-repellent steroids called "lucibufagins". In males the light organ covers the entire ventral surface of the three most posterior segments and in females it only covers a portion of the third posterior segment. These fireflies are most noticeable around twilight, in the early part of the evening and hover close to the ground. The species' common name refers to the characteristic flight of the male, which flies in a J-shaped trajectory, lighting on the upswing. During flight, the J-shaped flight pattern is used in combination with patrolling flash patterns while seeking a mate. Their flashes are stimulated by light conditions, not by rhythmic impulses as originally thought.

The genome of Photinus pyralis was sequenced in 2018.

Light production
Males of Photinus pyralis locate females by a series of light flashes, to which females respond with a coded delay flash. 
The light organ of P. pyralis is composed of two layers; a layer of refractile cells on the dorsal side and a photic layer with light-producing cells on the ventral side. The light organ (specifically the photogenic layer) is supplied with numerous tracheal branches, which are thought to provide the required oxygen for light production. The light-producing enzyme is luciferase, and is found within cells of the lantern. Luciferases require oxygen, luciferin and adenosine triphosphate (ATP) to catalyze a chemical reaction that produces bioluminescence in these insects. It has been shown that the glow is not controlled by the tracheal end cells (which were thought to contain valves) nor by central nerve impulses through studies involving low oxygen conditions. Pupae of these beetles have different light organs than the adult. They do not have the characteristic tracheal end cells of the flashing adults, and whereas the adults emit bright flashes, pupae emit low intensity glowing.

Defense
Beetles from the family Lampyridae have been known to use certain defenses such as unpleasant odour and the excretion of a sticky substance to avoid predation. Excretion of unpleasant fluids from the areas along the elytra and pronotum is the result of tactile stimulation and has been referred to as reflexive bleeding. This reflex bleeding is a defensive function of P. pyralis, as it can cause certain predators to become entangled in the sticky substance (such as ants) or cause revulsion in others upon predation. The excretion contains lucibufagins, steroids found in P. pyralis that render them distasteful to certain bird predators. Whereas adult flashing is used in mate signaling, pupae glow is thought to be an aposematic display for nocturnal predators.

In relation, males of the Photinus species are the prey for females of a different genus, Photuris. Photuris females actually mimic the effects of the Photinus males light-signaling patterns, and by doing this the females lure in the Photinus males. The males naturally produce the steroid lucibufagin, and the reason that the females prey on these males is to obtain this steroid. Once the females prey on the Photinus males, the females gain the steroid lucibufagin to use to their defense against jumping spiders. A study was performed where the Photuris females were collected from nature and forced to reflex bleed which contains the steroid lucibufagin. It was found that when the females were forced to reflex bleed, the samples taken from each female had different amounts of the steroid in each sample. So after experiments were brought out to see which females the jumping spiders would eat it was decided that the jumping spiders were more likely to eat the females with less lucibufagin inside their bodies and the females with more were constantly rejected by the spiders therefore protecting themselves from predation.

Mating
Males are the first to start the series of patrolling flashes needed to locate and mate with a female. Males will actively fly while flashing, whereas females are sedentary. They will flash every 6 seconds and wait for a responding flash from the female, which comes after a 1-2 second delay  It has been shown that females only respond to their conspecific males; identifying them by the color of their yellow bioluminescent flash, in combination with the temporal patterning, duration and intensity of the male flash. Females will twist their abdomen towards the males flash, presenting their own flash toward the male. Males can be observed flying in a nearly vertical orientation; their antennae held forward and stiff while their legs are held toward the body during patrolling. They also show an obvious gaze shift towards the last female flash, and continue towards it until the female firefly flashes again. The flashes continue until the male reaches the female. Males congregate in large masses and it is most likely that more than one will find the same female; in this case male P. pyralis display aggression towards one another while not in flight.

During the "aggression" stage, males with smaller elytra and smaller lanterns are favored; whereas during the signaling phase, males with longer elytra and bigger lanterns are favoured. Males with larger lanterns are favored in signaling phases of courtship because their broadcasting flashes can be seen by females who are further away, it is also suggested that due to their longer elytra these males may also have an advantage of finding the females faster.
Photinus fireflies do not feed as adults  and therefore males are better able to attract females by offering nuptial food gifts, in the form of spermatophores which females can use to provide nutrients to their eggs.

References

External links

BugGuide with details of Photinus pyralis

Lampyridae
Bioluminescent insects
Beetles described in 1767
Beetles of North America
Taxa named by Carl Linnaeus